The 2002 Grand Prix de Trois-Rivières was the sixth round of the 2002 American Le Mans Series season.  It took place on a temporary street circuit known as Circuit Trois-Rivières in Quebec, on August 3, 2002.

Official results
Class winners in bold.

Statistics
 Pole Position - #1 Audi Sport North America - 0:58.698
 Fastest Lap - #1 Audi Sport North America - 0:59.568
 Distance - 406.337 km
 Average Speed - 135.214 km/h

External links
 
 World Sports Racing Prototypes - Race Results

T
Grand Prix de Trois-Rivieres